The FIA WTCR Race of Belgium, previously known as the FIA WTCC Race of Belgium, is a round of the World Touring Car Cup, most recently held at the Circuit Zolder in Belgium. It has also been held at Circuit de Spa-Francorchamps.

The race was run in the first season of the revived World Touring Car Championship in 2005, at the Circuit de Spa-Francorchamps. Having been left off the calendar for four seasons, the Race of Belgium returned in 2010, this time being held at Zolder. Having also run in 2011, Belgium was left off the 2012 calendar. The race is scheduled to return for the 2014 season, returning to the Spa–Francorchamps circuit with a provisional date of 22 June. Belgium was dropped from the calendar once again when the 2015 schedule was revealed.

No Belgian drivers have won their home race although two drivers, Pierre-Yves Corthals and Vincent Radermecker have both contested their home event.

Winners

References

  
Belgium
Belgium
Auto races in Belgium
Circuit de Spa-Francorchamps
Circuit Zolder